The Minister of National Defense was a government minister in charge of the Ministry of National Defense of South Vietnam (common name for the State of Vietnam and the Republic of Vietnam), in what is now southern region of Vietnam. The Minister was responsible for conducting defense strategies and affairs of the country.

List of ministers
The following is a list of defence ministers of South Vietnam from 1949 until the fall of Saigon in 1975:

References

South Vietnam